The 2023 Europe Top 16 Cup (also referred to as the 2023 CCB Europe Top 16 Cup for sponsorship reasons) was a table tennis competition that took place on 25 and 26 February 2023 in Montreux, Switzerland, organised under the authority of the European Table Tennis Union (ETTU).

Slovenia's Darko Jorgić and Germany's Han Ying both completed back-to-back victories in the event, having also won the titles in 2022.

Medallists

References

External links
ITTF website

Europe Top 16 Cup
Europe Top 16 Cup
Europe Top 16 Cup
Table tennis competitions in Switzerland
International sports competitions hosted by Switzerland
Sport in Montreux
Europe Top 16 Cup